Theodotus of Byzantium  ( Theodotos; also known as Theodotus the Tanner, Theodotus the Shoemaker, Theodotus the Cobbler, and Theodotus the Fuller; flourished late 2nd century) was an Adoptionist theologian from Byzantium, one of several named Theodotus whose writings were condemned as heresy in the early church.

Theodotus held the profession of a leatherworker or fuller in Byzantium. He taught that Jesus was a non-divine man, and though later "adopted" by God upon baptism (that is to say, he became the Christ), was not himself God until after his resurrection.

This doctrine, sometimes called "Dynamic Monarchianism" or "Adoptionism", was declared heretical by Pope Victor I, and Theodotus was excommunicated.

See also 

 Artemon
 Paul of Samosata

References

Sources
Lampe P, Johnson MD. Steinhauser M. (trans.) From Paul to Valentinus: Christians at Rome in the First Two Centuries Published by Fortress Press, 2003 Chapter 33: The Theodotians p. 344-9  

2nd-century people from Byzantium
2nd-century Christian theologians
Nontrinitarian Christians